Radhakrishnan, also spelt Rathakrishnan, is a common Indian given name.

Notable people with this name
 C. Radhakrishnan, Malayalam writer
 K. Radhakrishnan, former Chairman of ISRO
 P. Radhakrishnan (scientist), space scientist
 K. Radhakrishnan (politician), a politician from Kerala
 K. Radhakrishnan (police officer) (born 1957), an Indian Police Service officer
 Mina Radhakrishnan, American entrepreneur
 Pon Radhakrishnan, Indian Bharatiya Janata Party politician 
 R. Radhakrishnan, Chancellor's Professor of English and Comparative Literature
 R. Radhakrishnan (politician) (born 1975), politician 
 Radhakrishnan Nair Harshan, captain in Indian Army
 Sarvepalli Radhakrishnan, Indian philosopher and statesman
 Venkatraman Radhakrishnan, Indian space scientist
Rathakrishnan Ramasamy, Singaporean juvenile offender

See also
Radha Krishna (disambiguation)

Tamil masculine given names